Hans J. Lassen (1926–2011) was the last Danish Governor of Greenland from 1973 to 1979, when home rule was established.

He was a knight of the Order of the Dannebrog.

References

1926 births
2011 deaths
Governors of Greenland
People from Lejre Municipality